The World Federation of Chiropractic (WFC) is an international consulting body representing chiropractic to the international health care community.

Background 

In September 1987, at a World Chiropractic Summit convened by the European Chiropractors' Union in London, England. There was agreement that a President's Committee be formed to inquire into, and report upon, the formation of a world federation representing national chiropractic associations. The President's Committee reported, and the World Federation of Chiropractic was established in Sydney, Australia on October 2, 1988 at a World Chiropractic Congress organized by the Chiropractors' Association of Australia. It was initially conceived by Gary Auerbach of Tucson, Arizona, in consultation with David Chapman-Smith, a barrister practicing in Toronto, Canada.

The Federation today represents virtually every national chiropractic association in the world; now numbering nearly 90 Countries. The offices of the WFC are under the direction of Richard Brown, who has served as Secretary-General of the WFC since 2015.

Presidents

Recognition 

The WFC is in official relations as a non-governmental organization (NGO) with the World Health Organization. It achieved full formal relations status in 1997, after strong support from the World Federation of Neurology World Federation of Public Health Associations, and the International Council of Nurses. The WFC is also an Associate Member of the Council for International Organizations of Medical Sciences (CIOMS).

Associations

References

External links 
 
 List of National associations members of the World Federation of Chiropractic
 List of Chiropractic Schools

Organizations based in Toronto
Chiropractic organizations